James (also Jacques or Jacob; 1152 – 7 September 1191) was a son of Nicholas d'Oisy, Lord of Avesnes and Matilda de la Roche. He was the lord of Avesnes, Condé, and Leuze from 1171. In November 1187, James joined the Third Crusade as leader of a detachment of French, Flemish, and Frisian crusaders arriving by ship on the Palestinian coast near Acre around 10 September 1189. James and his men came as military reinforcements for the Siege of Acre. At the Battle of Arsuf, James was thrown from his saddle and, after slaying fifteen enemy warriors, was himself cut down. The next day, a search party of Hospitallers and Templars found his body on the battlefield. It was taken back to Arsuf and buried there in a ceremony attended by Richard the Lionheart and Guy of Lusignan.

He married Adela (died 1185), daughter of Bouchard of Guise, and was the father of:
Walter II of Avesnes
James, lord of Landrecies
William (died 1219)
Bouchard IV of Avesnes
Matilda, married (1) Nicholas IV of Rumigny and (2) Louis IV of Chiny
Adelaide, married Rogier of Rosoy (died 1246)
Ida (1180–1216), married Engelbert IV of Edingen
Adela, married (1) Henry III of Grandpré and (2) Ralph, Count of Soissons

References

1152 births
1191 deaths
Lords of Avesnes
Christians of the Third Crusade